Gymnema (Neo-Latin, from Greek γυμνὀς gymnos, "naked" and νῆμα, nēma, "thread") is a genus in the family Apocynaceae first described as a genus in 1810.

One species, Gymnema sylvestre, is commonly used as a dietary supplement and has the ability to suppress the taste of sweetness.

Species

formerly included

References

External links

 
Apocynaceae genera